The Pain is a 2009 Turkish drama film written, produced and directed by Cemal Şan, which looks at generation gaps through the story of an old man and his granddaughter. It is dedicated to Engin Çeber who died while he was in custody.

Plot 
Nesrin is a young girl fighting for freedom, while the grandfather Hıdır defends the family values. Through the story of Hıdır and Nesrin, the film brings forward the issues of identity, toleration, leniency, cultural differences and ethics. “Pain” is a universal story on the necessity of saying “no!” for a humanely life.

Release

General release 

Festival screenings
 2009
 Dadaş Film Festival
4th Bursa International Silk Road Film Festival
 3rd STEPS International Rights Film Festival
 2010
 28th International Fajr Film Festival
 21st Ankara International Film Festival

Reception

Box Office
The film reached number twenty-seven in the Turkish box office chart and has made a total gross of $27,488.

Awards
2009 Dadaş Film Festival
Best Film (Won) 
Best Director: Cemal Şan (Won)
Best Actress (Won)
3rd STEPS International Rights Film Festival
Best Screenplay: Cemal Şan (Won)
Best Music: Nail Yurtsever, Cem Tuncer & Engin Arslan (Won)
28th International Fajr Film Festival
Firuze Award (Won)

See also 
 2009 in film
 Turkish films of 2009

References

External links
 

2009 films
2009 drama films
Films set in Turkey
Turkish drama films